Zebra plant is a common name for several plants and may refer to:

Alocasia zebrina, in the family Araceae
Aphelandra squarrosa, in the family Acanthaceae
Calathea zebrina, in the family Marantaceae
Haworthiopsis attenuata, in the family Asphodelaceae
Haworthiopsis fasciata, in the family Asphodelaceae

See also
Amazonian zebra plant (Aechmea chantinii)